Richard Soumah (born 6 October 1986) is a professional footballer who plays as a midfielder. Born in France, he represented Guinea at International level.

Career
Born in Créteil, he started his career at Rennes, before moving to Guingamp in 2004. He made his professional debut in the 2005–06 season. During the 2011–12 season, he had a loan spell at Ligue 2 side Angers.

Whilst at Guingamp, then in Ligue 2, Soumah played in the 2009 Coupe de France Final in which they beat Rennes.

On 12 June 2017, he signed for Israeli Premier League club Maccabi Petah Tikva.

References

External links
 Player profile at FrenchLeague.com
Richard Soumah Profile on EAG UK

1986 births
Living people
Sportspeople from Créteil
Association football midfielders
French footballers
Citizens of Guinea through descent
Guinean footballers
En Avant Guingamp players
Stade Brestois 29 players
Angers SCO players
R.A.E.C. Mons players
Amiens SC players
Maccabi Petah Tikva F.C. players
Ligue 1 players
Ligue 2 players
Championnat National players
Belgian Pro League players
Israeli Premier League players
Guinean expatriate footballers
Expatriate footballers in Belgium
Expatriate footballers in Israel
Guinea international footballers
French sportspeople of Guinean descent
Apollon Limassol FC players
Expatriate footballers in Cyprus
Footballers from Val-de-Marne
Black French sportspeople